Salma Masud Chowdhury (born 13 December 1957) is a Bangladeshi justice of the High Court Division.

Early life and education 
Ara was born on 13 December 1957. Her father, Chowdhury A.T.M. Masud, was also a justice of the High Court Division. Her mother's name is Aminun Nesa Khatun.

Career 
Chowdhury was elevated as additional judge of the High Court Division on 29 July 2002 and appointed judge on 29 July 2004.

Chowdhury is a member of the Executive Council of the National Heart Foundation of Bangladesh. She along with Justice Quazi Reza-Ul Hoque and Justice AKM Zahirul Hoque has been barred from work over corruption allegations. Three justice have been out of court for three years as inquiries into their alleged misconduct.

Personal life
Chowdhury married to Selim Ahmed, a businessperson. They have a son, Shafayat Ahmed.

References

External links 
 Judges' List: High Court Division  Name and Short Biography

Living people
1957 births
Bangladeshi Muslims
Bangladeshi women judges